Lake Idku is one of the lakes in Egypt. The lake lies to the west of the city of Edku.

See also

 List of lakes of Egypt

References

Idku